Cycloramphus juimirim is a species of frog in the family Cycloramphidae.
It is endemic to Brazil.
Its natural habitats are subtropical or tropical moist lowland forest and rivers.

References

juimirim
Endemic fauna of Brazil
Amphibians of Brazil
Taxonomy articles created by Polbot
Amphibians described in 1989